The Cape Heath ctenotus (Ctenotus rawlinsoni)  is a species of skink found in Queensland in Australia.

References

rawlinsoni
Reptiles described in 1979
Taxa named by Glen Joseph Ingram